The 2023 King and Queen of the Ring is an upcoming professional wrestling pay-per-view (PPV) and livestreaming event produced by the American promotion WWE that will feature the 23rd King of the Ring tournament and second Queen's Crown tournament. This will be the 12th King of the Ring event, rebranded as King and Queen of the Ring with the incorporation of the women's Queen's Crown tournament, the first dedicated King of the Ring event since 2015, which aired exclusively on the WWE Network, and the first to broadcast on PPV since the 2002 event, as well as the first to livestream on Peacock. The event will be held for wrestlers from the promotion's Raw and SmackDown brand divisions, and is scheduled to be held on Saturday, May 27, 2023, at the Jeddah Super Dome in Jeddah, Saudi Arabia. It will be the ninth event that WWE will hold in Saudi Arabia under a 10-year partnership in support of Saudi Vision 2030.

Background 
The King of the Ring tournament is a men's single-elimination tournament that was established by WWE in 1985 with the winner being crowned "King of the Ring". It was held annually until 1991, with the exception of 1990. These early tournaments were held as special non-televised house shows and were held when the promotion was still called the World Wrestling Federation (WWF, renamed to WWE in 2002). In 1993, the promotion began to produce the King of the Ring tournament as a self-titled pay-per-view (PPV). Unlike the previous non-televised events, the PPV did not feature all of the tournament's matches. Instead, several of the qualifying matches preceded the event with the final few matches then taking place at the pay-per-view. There were also other matches that took place at the event as it was a traditional three-hour pay-per-view. The King of the Ring PPV was considered one of the promotion's "Big Five" PPVs, along with WrestleMania, SummerSlam, Survivor Series, and Royal Rumble from 1993 to 2002.

King of the Ring continued as the annual June PPV until the 2002 event, which was the final King of the Ring produced as a PPV. Following the conclusion of the PPV chronology, the tournament began to be held periodically every few years. In April 2011, WWE ceased using its full name of World Wrestling Entertainment with "WWE" becoming an orphaned initialism. The 2015 tournament aired as an event exclusively on WWE's livestreaming platform, the WWE Network. While the tournament continued to be periodically held, this 2015 event was the last dedicated King of the Ring event. On March 6, 2023, however, WWE announced that the King of the Ring event would be revived and rebranded as "King and Queen of the Ring" to incorporate the Queen's Crown tournament, the female counterpart to the men's tournament that was established in 2021 with its winners crowned "Queen". The event was scheduled to be held on Saturday, May 27, 2023, at the Jeddah Superdome in Jeddah, Saudi Arabia and feature wrestlers from the Raw and SmackDown brand divisions. It will be the ninth event that WWE will hold in Saudi Arabia under a 10-year partnership with the General Sports Authority in support of Saudi Vision 2030. This will subsequently be the first King of the Ring event to air on PPV since the 2002 event, and in addition to the WWE Network in international markets, it will be the first to air on Peacock in the United States.

Storylines 
The event will include matches that result from scripted storylines, where wrestlers portray heroes, villains, or less distinguishable characters in scripted events that build tension and culminate in a wrestling match or series of matches. Results are predetermined by WWE's writers on the Raw and SmackDown brands, while storylines are produced on WWE's weekly television shows, Monday Night Raw and Friday Night SmackDown.

References

2023 WWE Network events
2023 WWE pay-per-view events
2023 in Saudi Arabia
Entertainment events in Saudi Arabia
WWE in Saudi Arabia
Scheduled professional wrestling shows